Tea Vikstedt-Nyman (born 6 July 1959) is a retired female racing cyclist from Finland. She represented her native country at three consecutive Summer Olympics, starting in 1988.

References

External links

1959 births
Living people
Finnish female cyclists
Cyclists at the 1988 Summer Olympics
Cyclists at the 1992 Summer Olympics
Cyclists at the 1996 Summer Olympics
Olympic cyclists of Finland
People from Hyvinkää
Sportspeople from Uusimaa